Recknitz-Trebeltal is an Amt in the district of Vorpommern-Rügen, in Mecklenburg-Vorpommern, Germany. The seat of the Amt is in Tribsees.

The Amt Recknitz-Trebeltal consists of the following municipalities:
Bad Sülze
Dettmannsdorf
Deyelsdorf
Drechow
Eixen
Grammendorf
Gransebieth
Hugoldsdorf
Lindholz
Tribsees

Ämter in Mecklenburg-Western Pomerania